Old Angel is a studio album by the roots music band Lost Dogs. It was released in 2010 on Fools of the World and Stunt Records. The songs were composed by the band while traveling down Route 66 in 2009, and recorded in Nashville.

Track listing
 "Israelites & Okies" (Taylor)
 "Dancin' on the Devil's Elbow" (Taylor)
 "Turn it Around" (Hindalong/Roe)
 "The Glory Road" (Taylor/Flesch/Chandler)
 "America's Main Street" (Taylor/Roe)
 "Traveling Mercies" (Taylor/Daugherty)
 "Dust in My Bowl" (Taylor)
 "Pearl Moon" (Taylor)
 "The World is Against Us" (Taylor)
 "Wicked Guns" (Hindalong)
 "Goodbye Winslow" (Daugherty/Taylor/Hindalong)
 "Desert Flowers" (Daugherty/Taylor/Hindalong)
 "Dead End Diner" (Taylor)
 "Carry Me" (Hindalong/Daugherty)
 "Old Angel" (Taylor)

The band
Derri Daugherty — vocals and guitar
Steve Hindalong — drums, percussion, glockenspiel, and saw
Mike Roe — vocals, guitar, and mandolin
Terry Scott Taylor — vocals and guitar

Additional personnel
Banjo, Mandolin - Jimmy Abegg
Bass - Tim Chandler
Fiddle - Shad Cobb
Keyboards, Accordion - Ben Shive
Pedal Steel Guitar - Greg Kellogg
Angelic Voice - Liesl Dromi
Radio Preacher - Pastor Joe Daugherty (track 8)

Production notes
Producer - Lost Dogs
Recorded By - Derri Daugherty, Mike Roe
Mixed By - Derri Daugherty
Recorded and Mixed at Sled Dog Studio, Franklin TN
Additional recording at Dolce Hayes Mansion room 150, San Jose CA
Mastered at Yes Master, Nashville, TN
Mastered By - Jim DeMain
Pro Tools Editing By - Erin Kaus
Executive Producers - Beth Jahnsen, Glenn Miller, Linda Miller
Art Direction & Design, Photography - Jimmy Abegg
Design & Layout Assistance - Brian Heydn

References

External links
 www.TheLostDogs.com
 Lost Dogs on Facebook
 Lost Dogs at MySpace.com
 Old Angel on iTunes

Lost Dogs albums
Stunt Records albums
2010 albums